A Mary Pickford is a Prohibition Era cocktail made with white rum, fresh pineapple juice, grenadine, and Maraschino liqueur. It is served shaken and chilled, often with a Maraschino cherry.

History 

Named for Canadian-American film  actress Mary Pickford (1892–1979), it is said to have been created for her in the 1920s by either Eddie Woelke or Fred Kaufmann at the Hotel Nacional de Cuba on a trip she took to Havana with Charlie Chaplin and Douglas Fairbanks.

See also 

 Bloody Mary (cocktail)
 Queen Mary (cocktail)

References

Cocktails with fruit liqueur
Cocktails with rum
Cocktails with pineapple juice
Cocktails with grenadine
Sweet cocktails
Cuban cocktails
Tiki drinks